A list of films produced in Italy in 1934 (see 1934 in film):

See also
List of Italian films of 1933
List of Italian films of 1935

References

External links
 *Italian films of 1934 at the Internet Movie Database

Lists of 1934 films by country or language
1934
Films